Nelson Luis Marcenaro (4 September 1952 – 13 May 2021) was an Uruguayan footballer who played as a centre back.

Career
Born in Montevideo, Marcenaro played club football for Progreso, Portuguesa, Peñarol, and Emelec. With Peñarol he won the national title on four occasions, and also won the Copa Libertadores and Intercontinental Cup.

He also earned 8 caps for the Uruguay national team between 1979 and 1981, they won the 1980 Mundialito.

Personal life
His brother Roland was also a footballer and later a coach.

From 2014 he worked to support former footballers with food and housing.

He suffered a stroke in March 2020. He died on 13 May 2021, aged 68, from a heart attack.

References

1952 births
2021 deaths
Uruguayan footballers
Uruguay international footballers
C.A. Progreso players
Portuguesa F.C. players
Peñarol players
C.S. Emelec footballers
Association football defenders
Uruguayan expatriate footballers
Uruguayan expatriate sportspeople in Venezuela
Expatriate footballers in Venezuela
Uruguayan expatriate sportspeople in Ecuador
Expatriate footballers in Ecuador
Footballers from Montevideo